Xylariopsis is a genus of beetles in the family Cerambycidae, containing the following species:

subgenus Falsosybra
 Xylariopsis fulvonotata (Pic, 1928)

subgenus Xylariopsis
 Xylariopsis esakii Mitono, 1943
 Xylariopsis iriei Hayashi, 1976
 Xylariopsis mimica Bates, 1884

References

Apomecynini